Chingizid kosachevi is a moth in the family Cossidae. It was described by Yakovlev in 2012 and is endemic to Mongolia.

References

Natural History Museum Lepidoptera generic names catalog

Cossinae
Endemic fauna of Mongolia
Moths described in 2012
Moths of Asia